Eddystone station is a station along the SEPTA Wilmington/Newark Line and Amtrak Northeast Corridor. Amtrak does not stop here, only SEPTA serves this station. Eddystone is a borough in Delaware County, Pennsylvania, United States.

The area of Eddystone is rather historic, home to the Baldwin Locomotive Works, which built 100,000+ steam, diesel, and electric locomotives until the mid-1950s. The station, located at Industrial Highway (PA 291) & Saville Avenue, includes a 12-space parking lot. A second platform exists along Seventh Street west of Saville Avenue.

Station layout
Eddystone has two low-level side platforms with walkways connecting passengers to the inner tracks. Amtrak's Northeast Corridor lines bypass the station via the inner tracks.

References

External links
SEPTA – Eddystone Station
 7th Street entrance from Google Maps Street View

SEPTA Regional Rail stations
Stations on the Northeast Corridor
Railway stations in Delaware County, Pennsylvania
Wilmington/Newark Line